The 1976 Winter Paralympic Games were the first Winter Paralympics. They were held in Örnsköldsvik, Sweden, from 21 to 28 February 1976. The disabilities included in this Paralympics were blindness and amputees. Sixteen countries took part with 196 athletes. There were competitions in Alpine and Nordic skiing for amputee and visually impaired athletes, and a demonstration event in ice sledge racing.

They were originally known as the 1st Winter Olympic Games for the Disabled.

Sports
The games consisted of 2 sports.
 Alpine skiing
 Cross-country skiing

Medal table

The top 9 NPCs by number of gold medals are listed below. The host nation (Sweden) is highlighted.

Participating Paralympic Committees
The following nations took part. In brackets is the number of athletes per nation.

British involvement in these Games was covered in an edition of the Thames Television current affairs series This Week.

See also

 1976 Winter Olympics
 1976 Summer Paralympics

References

External links
 International Paralympic Committee
 The event at SVT's open archive 

 
Paralympics
Paralympics
Paralympics
Winter Paralympic Games
Multi-sport events in Sweden
Sports competitions in Örnsköldsvik
February 1976 sports events in Europe
Winter sports competitions in Sweden
Parasports in Sweden